Shagit Hudayberdin (born Hudaiberdino, 9 October 1896 – 21 December 1924) was a Bashkir revolutionary active in the Russian Revolution. From 23 November 1921 to March 1922 he was the Responsible Secretary of the Bashkir Regional Committee of the All-Union Communist Party (Bolsheviks).

Biography

Shagit was born on October 9, 1896, in the village, formerly called Piancino, in 1924 renamed Hudaiberdino (Kugarchinsky District of Bashkortostan). The elementary Russian Bashkir School was opened there. After finishing it he entered the Orenburg madrasa "Khusainiya". In 1914, for agitation against the administration regime, the madrasa Sh. Hudaiberdin was excluded from the number of shakirds.

Since the beginning of the First World War, Shagita Hudayberdin was drafted into the Russian imperial army, which interrupted his training in a madrasa. Having completed short-term medical attendant courses, he will be sent to the front as a company medical assistant. Participates in many battles. After being seriously wounded on the Austrian front in 1916, he returned to Ufa. The February Revolution is greeted by the soldier of the 144th reserve rifle regiment in Ufa. In the Ufa garrison there were several thousand soldiers, among whom were many Muslims. He actively participates in the soldiers' democratic movement, becoming a member of the Ufa Muslim Military Council, is a member of the editorial board of Soldat Telyage (Desire of a Soldier), writes stories, poems, articles, leads a revolutionary campaign for ending the imperialist war, for transferring all power to the Soviets leading a revolutionary work among the Bashkirs and Tatars, defending internationalist positions.

In May 1917, the Ufa Muslim Military Council was organized. Shagit Hudayberdin became a member of the editorial board of the newspaper Желание солдата and became an active correspondent.

Hudaiberdin was actively involved in the strengthening of Soviet power. On October 29, 1917, at a general meeting of the Ufa Muslim Military Council, he read out a decision supporting the slogan "All power to the Soviets!" (!) and the Soviet government. On November 30, he was elected along with the Bolsheviks N. Bryukhanov, A. Svidersky, A. Cheverev, T. Krivov, A. Tsyurupa, E. Kadomtsev to the Ufa provincial executive committee of the Soviets, becoming a member of the revolutionary military tribunal of the Sterlitamak fortified district, a member of the board of the Muslim committee on Bashkir Affairs. In March 1918, he moved from the social-revolutionary to the RCP (B.), was engaged in agitation work among the Bashkir and Tatar people during the rebellion of the White Czechs, created a Muslim detachment. During the battles of Bugulma, S. Hudaiberdin is wounded, and he is sent to a hospital. Having healed the wound, he worked for some time in Moscow at the Central Muslim Commissariat, managing his Bashkir department. Returning to the political department of the 5th Army of the Eastern Front, he campaigns among Muslim soldiers, published in the newspaper «Кызыл яу», where he actively criticizes the counter-revolutionary activities of Zeki Velidi Togan was one of the leaders of the Bashkir national movement.

S. Hudaiberdin participates in the liberation of Ufa in 1919. Becomes a member of the Ufa Provincial Provisional Revolutionary Committee. Then he is appointed head of the Revolutionary Committee Committee for Muslim Affairs, approved by the chairman of the Muslim section of the Communists under the Ufa provincial committee of the RCP (B.).

As a political worker of the 5th Army, which pursued Kolchak to the East, leaves Ufa, with battles it reaches Petropavlovsk. In the post of division commander at the end of 1919 he returned to Bashkiria, transferred to state and party work. He heads the Burzyan-Tangaur Kantispolkom and Kantcom RCP (b). In 1920, he was elected a delegate to the 10th Congress of the RCP (b) and a candidate member of the Presidium of the Bashobkom RCP (b), a member of the BashTsIK. Participated in the suppression of the counter-revolutionary Kronstadt rebellion. Was injured. He lay in the hospital. In 1921–1924, he worked as chairman of the Bashkir CEC, political (first) secretary of the Bashobkom RCP (b), deputy people's commissar of agriculture, until the end of his life he headed the people's commissariat of internal affairs .

Hudaiberdin is actively involved in the political life of the Bashkir Republic. He is a delegate of many soldiers, farmhands, peasant congresses, state commissions. Under his leadership, work was carried out on the formation of the norms of the modern Bashkir literary language and its introduction into clerical work as the state language of the republic.

Member of the editorial board of the newspaper "Bashkortostan", was a delegate to the X and XI Congress of the RCP (b). Together with other delegates of the 10th Congress of the RCP (B), he participated in the suppression of the Kronstadt insurgency, where he was seriously wounded.

In November 1924, Sh. Hudaiberdin left for a meeting in Moscow, where the consequences of his injury sharply worsened. He was taken to the clinic of Moscow University, where he died on December 21, 1924.

Buried in Ufa in the park to them. V.I. Lenin.

Legacy
The Shagit Hudayberdin Governmental Prize has been awarded since 1989.
Shagit Hudayberdin Museum.  The museum was opened in 1976 in its native village, formerly called Piancino, in 1924 renamed Hudaiberdino. Here are the documents, letters, photographs, things that belonged to S. Hudaiberdin and his family; history of the village and the school. Shagita Hudayberdin.
Baymak - Machine Building Plant in the name of Shagit Khudayberdin.

References

1896 births
1924 deaths
Soviet people
Russian Marxists
Bashkir revolutionaries
People from Kugarchinsky District